Cell division cycle 23 homolog (S. cerevisiae), also known as CDC23, is a protein that, in humans, is encoded by the CDC23 gene.

Function 

The CDC23 protein shares strong similarity with Saccharomyces cerevisiae Cdc23, a protein essential for cell cycle progression through the G2/M transition. This protein is a component of anaphase-promoting complex (APC), which is composed of eight protein subunits and highly conserved in eukaryotic cells. APC catalyzes the formation of cyclin B-ubiquitin conjugate that is responsible for the ubiquitin-mediated proteolysis of B-type cyclins. This protein and 3 other members of the APC complex contain the TPR (tetratricopeptide repeat), a protein domain important for protein-protein interaction.

Interactions 

CDC23 has been shown to interact with CDC27.

References

External links

Further reading